Ajay Kudua (born 26 March 1976) is an Indian cricketer who played 61 first-class matches between 1994 and 2005. 

Kudua was a key batsman for Kerala. In 2017, he was appointed as the batting coach of the Kerala T20 and 50-over teams.

Kudua has also served the Chennai cricket club, Jolly Rovers, as a player as well as coach for more than 20 years.

References

External links
 

1976 births
Living people
Kerala cricketers
Indian cricketers
South Zone cricketers
Cricketers from Kochi